Meia Praia is a halt on the Algarve Line in the Lagos municipality, Portugal.

Services
This halt is used by regional trains, operated by Comboios de Portugal.

References

Railway stations in Portugal
Railway stations opened in 1922